The 1980–81 Missouri Tigers men's basketball team represented the University of Missouri as a member of the Big Eight Conference during the 1980–81 NCAA men's basketball season. Led by head coach Norm Stewart, the Tigers won the Big Eight regular season title, reached the NCAA tournament, and finished with an overall record of 22–10 (10–4 Big Eight).

Roster
Ricky Frazier, So.
Steve Stipanovich, So.
Jon Sundvold, So.
Head Coach: Norm Stewart

Schedule and results

 
|-
!colspan=9 style=| Regular season

|-
!colspan=9 style=| Big Eight Conference tournament

|-
!colspan=9 style=| NCAA tournament

Rankings

Awards

References

Missouri
Missouri
Missouri Tigers men's basketball seasons